The Sindh (Repeal of the Sindh Local Government Ordinance, 2001 and Revival of the Sindh Local Government Ordinance, 1979) Act, 2011 was an act passed by the Provincial Assembly of Sindh on July 13, 2011 and assented to by the Acting Governor of Sindh, Nisar Ahmed Khuhro, on July 14, 2011. The act repealed the Sindh Local Government Ordinance, 2001 and restored the Sindh Local Government Ordinance, 1979. The act restored the tiers of government outlined in the 1979 ordinance: City Government Karachi, District Government, Town/Taluka Municipal Administration, and Union Administration.

Acting Governor Khuhro stated that the Sindh Local Government Ordinance, 2001 had been introduced by former president Pervez Musharraf without the consent of the people and that no amendment could be made without Musharraf's approval.

The act was one of three key bills passed on the same day which were met vocal opposition from MQM lawmakers. The Acting Governor ignored the demands of MQM lawmakers.

Moulvi Iqbal Haider, advocate general of Sindh, filed a petition challenging the act stating that the Sindh Local Government Ordinance of 1979 couldn't be revived without amending the Constitution of Pakistan.

See also 

 Sindh Local Government Ordinance, 2001
 Sindh Local Government Ordinance, 1979
The Sindh Local Government Act, 2013

References

2011 in Pakistani law
Government of Sindh
Local government legislation
Repeal of the Sindh Local Government Ordinance, 2001 and Revival of the Sindh Local Government Ordinance, 1979
Local government in Sindh